Kalu dodol (Tamil: தொடோல்) is a sweet dish, a type of dodol that is popular in Sri Lanka. The dark and sticky dish consists mainly of kithul jaggery (from the sap of the toddy palm), rice flour and coconut milk. Kalu dodol is a very difficult and time-consuming dish to prepare. The Hambanthota area is famous for the production of this dish.

Origins and history
Kalu dodol is believed to have been introduced to Sri Lanka by Indonesian migrants, It has also been attributed to the Portuguese, who occupied parts of the country during the 16th and 17th centuries.
With the introduction of artificial ingredients in recent times, the preparation of kalu dodol has occasionally deviated from the traditional recipes.

Kalu dodol, along with other traditional sweets, is commonly prepared and consumed in celebration of the Sinhala New Year. As the process of making the dish is difficult and time-consuming, nowadays most people don't make kalu dodol themselves, instead preferring to buy it from shops.

Kalu dodol capital

The Hambanthota area in southern Sri Lanka is famous for kalu dodol, and is sometimes referred to as the kalu dodol capital. The kalu dodol industry is a major source of income for many people in the area.

The kalu dodol shops in Hambanthota are frequently visited by pilgrims coming to visit the nearby holy town of Kataragama. In 2011, the Sri Lankan government allocated Rs. 134 million for setting up kalu dodol sales centres in the Hambanthota area, in an effort to develop the industry.

Description
The main ingredients of kalu dodol are kithul jaggery (from the treacle of the Caryota urens plant), rice flour and coconut milk. Other ingredients such as cashews, cardamom and raisins may be added. It is dark brown in colour and is a thick, sticky and sweet jelly-like dish with a "slightly granulated" texture.

To make the dish, the kithul jaggery and thin coconut milk is mixed and boiled in a large pan until the mixture is reduced to half the original amount. The rice flour, thick coconut milk and the rest of the ingredients are then added. It is necessary to continuously stir the mixture while simmering, to prevent it from burning and sticking to the pan. The oil that floats to the surface of the mixture must also be repeatedly removed. Once the mixture becomes thick, it is poured into a tray, pressed, and left to cool. This labour-intensive process can take up to nine hours. The firm kalu dodol is cut into pieces before serving.

References

Sri Lankan desserts and sweets
Foods containing coconut
Sinhalese New Year foods